Asker Upper Secondary School is an upper secondary school in Asker, Norway. Founded in 1955, it has 680 students  aged 16–19, as of 2018. The school offers general academics and sports.

Alumni
Notable former (and current) students include Morten Harket (A-ha), and Helge Lund (CEO of StatoilHydro).

References

External links
Official site

Secondary schools in Norway
Asker
Educational institutions established in 1955
1955 establishments in Norway
Akershus County Municipality
Education in Viken (county)